Nabowla is a rural locality in the local government area of Dorset in the North-east region of Tasmania. The 2016 census determined a population of 112 for the state suburb of Nabowla.

History
Nabowla is an Aboriginal word meaning river. The locality was gazetted in 1964.

Geography
The Denison River and Little Forester River each form part of the western boundary. The Bridestowe Lavender Estate is within the locality.

Road infrastructure
The B81 route (Golconda Road) enters from the west and passes through to the east. Route C827 (Bridport Back Road) starts at an intersection with B81 and runs north before exiting.

References

Localities of Dorset Council (Australia)
Towns in Tasmania